The Crucifix of Destiny is a 1920 silent short semi-religious film written and directed by R. Dale Armstrong (who dedicates it to his late mother) and starring Wheeler Dryden, half-brother of Charlie Chaplin.

Note:...Previously this film was thought to star matinee hero Wallace Reid who does not appear anywhere in the existing print.

Cast
Signor Antonio Corsi - Father Ferdinand, monk
Wheeler Dryden - Paul Drummond
Audrey Chapman - Jean Carroll
Kitty Bradbury - Jean's mother

References

External links

The Crucifix of Destiny available for free download from Internet Archive(Prelinger Archive)

1920 films
American silent short films
Films based on short fiction
American black-and-white films
1920s American films
Silent horror films